The Hinton Historic District is a national historic district located at  Hinton, Summers County, West Virginia. The original Hinton Historic District is bordered roughly by the Chesapeake and Ohio Railroad line, James Street, 5th Avenue, and Roundhouse. The boundary increase extended the district to include Mill Street.  It was listed on the National Register of Historic Places in 1984 and revised in 2005.

It encompasses 212 contributing buildings, one contributing structure (a railroad water tank), and two contributing objects (veterans' memorials). They include the business and commercial core of Hinton and surrounding residential areas.  The buildings are largely two and three story with first floor commercial activities with offices and apartments above.  Many of the buildings feature stone trim and some have cast iron store fronts.  Residential buildings are representative of popular late 19th- and early 20th-century architectural styles.

Notable buildings include the Wagon Wheel Restaurant (1876), Summers County Library, R.R. Flanagan Building (c. 1906), Lowe Furniture Company Building (c. 1905), former National Bank of Summers building, O. Ike Keaton residence (c. 1905), Bluestone Tire Company building (C. 1919), C&O Railway Passenger Station, Y.M.C.A. (c. 1911), First Baptist Church (1913), Hotel McCreery (c. 1907), Ewart-Miller Building (c. 1905), McCreery / Palmer residence, Carnegie Library, Summers County Jail (1870s), and U.S. Post Office (1926, expanded 1960s).  Located in the district is the separately listed Summers County Courthouse.

Gallery

References

External links

National Register of Historic Places in Summers County, West Virginia
Neoclassical architecture in West Virginia
Historic districts in Summers County, West Virginia
Historic districts on the National Register of Historic Places in West Virginia
Victorian architecture in West Virginia
American Foursquare architecture in West Virginia